The 1983 Uttlesford District Council election took place on 3 May 1983 to elect members of Uttlesford District Council in England. This was on the same day as other local elections.

Summary

|}

References

Uttlesford
Uttlesford District Council elections
1980s in Essex